Bliss is a common noun meaning 'extreme happiness'. It may also refer to:

People
Bliss (name), list of people with the name

Culture

Literature
 Bliss (novel) (1981), by Peter Carey
 Bliss, a 2005 novel by Fiona Zedde
Bliss, a 2005 novel by Danyel Smith
 Bliss (short story) (1920), by Katherine Mansfield; republished in: 
 Bliss (short story collection): and Other Stories (1920) by Katherine Mansfield

Fictional entities
 Bliss (Marvel Comics), member of the Marvel Comics mutant group The Morlocks
 Bliss (Starman), incubus who appeared in the DC Comics series Starman
 Bliss (The Powerpuff Girls), a character from the 2016 series The Powerpuff Girls
 Dee Bliss, fictional character on the Australian soap Neighbours
 Bliss Colby, fictional character of the American prime time soap opera The Colbys
 The Bliss, a telepathic ability in the 2009 series V
 Blissenobiarella, also known as Bliss, a character in Asimov's Foundation series
 Bliss, a fictional hallucinogenic drug in the 2018 video game Far Cry 5

Film
 Bliss (1917 film), starring Harold Lloyd
 Bliss (1985 film), directed by Ray Lawrence, adapted from the Peter Carey novel
 Bliss (1997 film), starring Terence Stamp, Sheryl Lee and Craig Sheffer
 Bliss (2006 film), aka Fu Sheng, Chinese film produced by Fruit Chan
 Bliss (2007 film), aka Mutluluk, directed by Abdullah Oguz, adapted from the Zülfü Livaneli novel
 Bliss (2011 film), a biographical film about the early years of New Zealand author Katherine Mansfield
 Bliss (2017 film), a Philippine thriller film
 Bliss (2019 film), a horror film written and directed by Joe Begos
 Bliss (2021 film), a science fiction film written and directed by Mike Cahill

Television
 Bliss (TV channel), a British music television channel playing classic hits
 Bliss, a 1995 British television film written and directed by Les Blair
 Bliss (1995 TV series), British ITV series
 Bliss (2018 TV series), a 2018 British-American produced television series
 Bliss (Canadian TV series), a 2002 Canadian produced dramatic television series that ran from 2002 to 2004
 "Bliss" (Star Trek: Voyager), episode from the fifth season

Music

Composers
 Arthur Bliss, English composer and conductor

Bands
 Bliss (British band), an English pop group
 Bliss (Danish band), a Danish music band
 Jonathan Notley, aka MC Bliss, part of the Australian hip hop group Bliss n Eso

Albums
 Bliss (12 Rods album) (1993), by indie rock band 12 Rods
 Bliss (Birdbrain album) (1995), the debut album by post-grunge band Birdbrain
 Bliss (Vanessa Paradis album) (2000), by French pop singer Vanessa Paradis
 Bliss (Nikki Webster album) (2002), the second studio album by Nikki Webster
 Bliss (Tone Damli album) (2005), Norwegian singer Tone Damli's first studio album
 The Bliss Album…? (Vibrations of Love and Anger and the Ponderance of Life and Existence) (1993), an album by P.M. Dawn
 Bliss! (1973), by Chick Corea, originally called Turkish Women at the Bath

EPs
 Bliss, a 2019 EP by Australian musician Kian

Songs
 "Bliss" (Th' Dudes song), a 1980 song by New Zealand rock band Th' Dudes
 "Bliss" (Tori Amos song), a 1999 song by Tori Amos
 "Bliss" (Muse song), a 2001 song by the English rock band Muse
 "Bliss" (Mariah Carey song), a song on Mariah Carey's 1999 Rainbow album
 "Bliss", song on trio Blaque's Blaque Out album
 "Bliss (I Don't Wanna Know)", a song on Hinder's Extreme Behavior album
 "Bliss", a Paul Gilbert song from his Burning Organ album
 "Bliss", a song by Delirious? from their album Mezzamorphis
 "Bliss", a song by Still Remains, from the album Of Love and Lunacy
 "Bliss", a song by Phish, from the album Billy Breathes
 "Bliss", a song by Alice Peacock
 "Bliss", a song by Nelly Furtado on the vinyl version of The Ride

Other uses in culture
 Bliss (magazine), a UK teen magazine
 Bliss (opera), a 2010 opera based on Peter Carey's novel of the same name
 Bliss (video game), a 2005 adult computer game
 Bliss, a newspaper comic by Harry Bliss

Brands and companies
 Bliss (charity), a special care baby charity
 Bliss (spa), a spa and retail product company
 Bliss, bite-sized chocolates manufactured by The Hershey Company
 Bliss, a type of synthetic cannabis

Technology
 BLISS, system programming language developed at Carnegie Mellon University
 Bliss (image), computer wallpaper included with Microsoft Windows XP
 Bliss (virus), computer virus that infects Linux systems
 BLISS (cryptography), a post-quantum digital signature scheme

Places

United States
 Bliss, Kentucky
 Bliss, Idaho
 Bliss, Missouri
 Bliss, New York
 Bliss, Oklahoma
 Bliss Corner, Massachusetts
 Bliss Township, Michigan
 Fort Bliss, Texas

Elsewhere
 Bliss (crater), small lunar impact crater that is located just to the west of the dark-floored crater Plato
 Bliss Bay, Greenland
 Bliss Street, Beirut, Lebanon

Transportation
 Bliss (yacht), a superyacht built by Palmer Johnson in 2014
 Gradient Bliss, a Czech paraglider design
 Bliss (automobile), from the early 1900s

Other uses
 Bliss (typeface), a font family
 Chicago Bliss, a team in the Lingerie Football League
 Blissymbols, an ideographic writing system
 Bliss bibliographic classification

See also
 Ignorance is bliss (disambiguation)
 BLIS (disambiguation)